Clubul Sportiv Școlar Târgoviște, commonly known as CSȘ Târgoviște, or simply Târgoviște, is a Romanian women's football club based in Târgoviște, Dâmbovița County, Romania. The team was founded in 2005 as a section of CSȘ Târgoviște sports society and appeared for the first time in the Liga I in the 2005–06 season when it finished 3rd.

The best performance of the club was winning the Romanian Women's Cup in the 2017–18 season, after a 3–0 win in the final against Heniu Prundu Bârgăului.

Honours

Leagues
Liga I
Runners-up (1): 2007–08
Liga II
Winners (2): 2015–16, 2020–21
Runners-up (1): 2014–15

Cups
Romanian Women's Cup
Winners (1): 2017–18
Runners-up (1): 2008–09

Season by season

Current squad

}

Club officials

Board of directors

 Last updated: 19 January 2019
 Source:

Current technical staff

 Last updated: 19 January 2019
 Source:

References

External links
 

Women's football clubs in Romania
Football clubs in Dâmbovița County
Sport in Târgoviște
Association football clubs established in 2005
2005 establishments in Romania